Alexandre Krasnoroutskiy (born 17 June 1987) is a former professional tennis player from Russia.

Biography
Krasnoroutskiy was born in the Crimean city of Kerch, the younger brother of Lina Krasnoroutskaya, who played professionally on the women's circuit. He was coached by his father Vladimir. As a junior he was ranked in the world's top 100 and made the round of 16 in the boys' singles at the 2005 French Open.

While at college he represented Russia at the 2007 Summer Universiade in Bangkok, where he won silver medals in both the men's and mixed doubles events, with Pavel Chekhov and Alisa Kleybanova respectively.

His professional career was mostly as a doubles player, he was ranked as high as 156 in the format and won a total of five doubles titles on the Challenger tour.

Krasnoroutskiy has worked as the hitting partner for several Russian players including Svetlana Kuznetsova and Ekaterina Makarova. He has also been involved as a coach with Russia's Olga Doroshina.

Challenger titles

Doubles: (5)

References

External links
 
 

1987 births
Living people
Russian male tennis players
Universiade medalists in tennis
People from Kerch
Ukrainian emigrants to Russia
Universiade silver medalists for Russia
Medalists at the 2007 Summer Universiade